The Fox Island School is a former public school in Fox Island, Washington.
On 15. July 1987 the National Register of Historic Places listed the building under the reference number 87001167 as a historic building.

Building
There were two classrooms for grades 1–4, and 5–8 on the first floor. The auditorium, which was used as a lunchroom also, has a stage on one side. Kitchen and restrooms are on the first floor also. The furnace, a play room, and storage where placed in the basement. The grounds were furnished with a baseball field, a playground, and a barn used to store the school bus.

History

The school was built under aid of the Works Progress Administration in 1934.
Between 1943 and 1948 the class sizes fluctuated so there were times when only one class was taught.
The Fox Island School District #337 was integrated into the Peninsula School District #401 in 1959 and the Fox Island School was closed in 1961. First the Grange took possession and later the Fox Island Community and Recreation Association (FICRA) took over operating the Fox Island School as a Community Center. In honor of Col. Frederick Nichols the name Nichols Center was given to the Community Center in 1981.

Literature
  Fox Island - A History by G. L. Miller

External links

 Nichols Community Center

References

National Register of Historic Places in Pierce County, Washington
School buildings on the National Register of Historic Places in Washington (state)
Puget Sound
Schools in Pierce County, Washington
School buildings completed in 1934
1934 establishments in Washington (state)